The Gilbert Building is a four-story Sullivanesque style building in downtown Beaumont, Texas. The building was built in 1903 by John Gilbert and contributes to the Beaumont Commercial District. As of July 2010, the building is abandoned.

See also

National Register of Historic Places listings in Jefferson County, Texas

References

External links

Buildings and structures in Beaumont, Texas
Historic district contributing properties in Texas
Buildings and structures completed in 1903
Unused buildings in Texas
National Register of Historic Places in Jefferson County, Texas